The women's 5000 metres at the 2013 Asian Athletics Championships was held at the Shree Shiv Chhatrapati Sports Complex on 7 July.

Results

References
Results

5000
5000 metres at the Asian Athletics Championships
2013 in women's athletics